North Central Windward (NC) is a Vincentian  Parliamentary Constituency. It is represented, and has been since 1994, by the current Prime Minister, Ralph Gonsalves.

Election
Vincentian general election, 2015

References

Parliamentary constituencies in Saint Vincent and the Grenadines